Cass Robert Sunstein (born September 21, 1954) is an American legal scholar known for his studies of constitutional law, administrative law, environmental law, and behavioral economics. He is also The New York Times best-selling author of The World According to Star Wars (2016) and Nudge (2008). He was the Administrator of the White House Office of Information and Regulatory Affairs in the Obama administration from 2009 to 2012.

As a professor at the University of Chicago Law School for 27 years, he wrote influential works on regulatory and constitutional law, among other topics. Since leaving the White House, Sunstein has been the Robert Walmsley University Professor at Harvard Law School. In 2014, studies of legal publications found Sunstein to be the most frequently cited American legal scholar by a wide margin.

Early life and education
Sunstein was born on September 21, 1954, in Waban, Massachusetts, to Marian (née Goodrich), a teacher, and Cass Richard Sunstein, a builder, both Jewish. He graduated in 1972 from Middlesex School. He has said that as a teenager, he was briefly infatuated with the works of Ayn Rand, "[b]ut after about six weeks of enchantment, her books started to make me sick. Contemptuous toward most of humanity, merciless about human frailty, and constantly hammering on the moral evils of redistribution, they produced a sense of claustrophobia."

After high school, Sunstein attended Harvard College. He was a member of the varsity squash team and an editor of the Harvard Lampoon, and graduated in 1975 with a Bachelor of Arts, magna cum laude. He then attended the Harvard Law School, where he became the executive editor of the Harvard Civil Rights-Civil Liberties Law Review and was a member of the winning team of the Ames Moot Court Competition. He graduated in 1978 with a Juris Doctor, magna cum laude.

Career
After law school, Sunstein first clerked for Justice Benjamin Kaplan of the Massachusetts Supreme Judicial Court from 1978 to 1979, then for Justice Thurgood Marshall of the U.S. Supreme Court from 1979 to 1980.

After his clerkships, Sunstein spent one year as an attorney-advisor in the U.S. Department of Justice's Office of Legal Counsel. In 1981, he became an assistant professor of law at the University of Chicago Law School (1981–1983), where he also became an assistant professor in the Department of Political Science (1983–1985). In 1985, Sunstein was made a full professor of both political science and law; in 1988, he was named the Karl N. Llewellyn Professor of Jurisprudence in the Law School and Department of Political Science. The university honored him in 1993 with its "distinguished service" accolade, permanently changing his title to Karl N. Llewellyn Distinguished Service Professor of Jurisprudence in the Law School and Department of Political Science. In 2009, Sunstein was described by fellow Chicago professor Douglas G. Baird as a "Chicago person through and through".

Sunstein was the Samuel Rubin Visiting Professor of Law at Columbia Law School in the fall of 1986 and a visiting professor at Harvard Law School in the spring 1987, winter 2005, and spring 2007 terms. He teaches courses in constitutional law, administrative law, and environmental law, as well as the required first-year course "Elements of the Law", which is an introduction to legal reasoning, legal theory, and the interdisciplinary study of law, including law and economics. In the fall of 2008, he joined the faculty of Harvard Law School and began serving as the director of its Program on Risk Regulation:

The Program on Risk Regulation will focus on how law and policy deal with the central hazards of the 21st century. Anticipated areas of study include terrorism, climate change, occupational safety, infectious diseases, natural disasters, and other low-probability, high-consequence events. Sunstein plans to rely on significant student involvement in the work of this new program.

On January 7, 2009, The Wall Street Journal reported that Sunstein would be named to head the White House Office of Information and Regulatory Affairs (OIRA). That news generated controversy among progressive legal scholars and environmentalists. Sunstein's confirmation was long blocked because of controversy over allegations about his political and academic views. On September 9, 2009, the Senate voted for cloture on Sunstein's nomination as Administrator of the Office of Information and Regulatory Affairs, Office of Management and Budget. The motion passed in a 63–35 vote. The Senate confirmed Sunstein on September 10, 2009, in a 57–40 vote.

In his research on risk regulation, Sunstein is known for developing, together with Timur Kuran, the concept of availability cascades, wherein popular discussion of an idea is self-feeding and causes individuals to over weigh its importance.

Sunstein's books include After the Rights Revolution (1990), The Partial Constitution (1993), Democracy and the Problem of Free Speech (1993), Legal Reasoning and Political Conflict (1996), Free Markets and Social Justice (1997), One Case at a Time (1999), Risk and Reason (2002), Why Societies Need Dissent (2003), Laws of Fear: Beyond the Precautionary Principle (2005), Radicals in Robes: Why Extreme Right-Wing Courts Are Wrong for America (2005), Are Judges Political? An Empirical Analysis of the Federal Judiciary (2005), Infotopia: How Many Minds Produce Knowledge (2006), and, co-authored with Richard Thaler, Nudge: Improving Decisions about Health, Wealth, and Happiness (2008).

Sunstein's 2006 book, Infotopia: How Many Minds Produce Knowledge, explores methods for aggregating information; it contains discussions of prediction markets, open-source software, and wikis. Sunstein's 2004 book, The Second Bill of Rights: FDR's Unfinished Revolution and Why We Need It More than Ever, advocates the Second Bill of Rights proposed by Franklin D. Roosevelt. Among these rights are a right to an education, a right to a home, a right to health care, and a right to protection against monopolies; Sunstein argues that the Second Bill of Rights has had a large international impact and should be revived in the United States. His 2001 book, Republic.com, argued that the Internet may weaken democracy because it allows citizens to isolate themselves within groups that share their own views and experiences, and thus cut themselves off from any information that might challenge their beliefs, a phenomenon known as cyberbalkanization.

Sunstein co-authored Nudge: Improving Decisions about Health, Wealth, and Happiness (Yale University Press, 2008) with economist Richard Thaler of the University of Chicago. Nudge discusses how public and private organizations can help people make better choices in their daily lives. Thaler and Sunstein argue that:

People often make poor choices – and look back at them with bafflement! We do this because as human beings, we all are susceptible to a wide array of routine biases that can lead to an equally wide array of embarrassing blunders in education, personal finance, health care, mortgages and credit cards, happiness, and even the planet itself.

The ideas in the book proved popular with politicians such as U.S. President Barack Obama, British Prime Minister David Cameron, and the British Conservative Party in general. The "Nudge" idea has also been criticised. Dr Tammy Boyce, from public health foundation The King's Fund, has said:
We need to move away from short-term, politically motivated initiatives such as the 'nudging people' idea, which are not based on any good evidence and don't help people make long-term behavior changes.

Contributing to the anthology Our American Story (2019), Sunstein addressed the possibility of a shared American narrative. He cited the concepts of self-government and equal dignity of human beings, but focused in particular on stories: "an emphasis on what happened before and after the firing shots in Concord and the courageous response of the embattled farmers maintains continuity with the historical facts and offers us something on which we can build."

Sunstein is a contributing editor to The New Republic and The American Prospect and is a frequent witness before congressional committees. He played an active role in opposing the impeachment of Bill Clinton in 1998.

In recent years, Sunstein has been a guest writer on The Volokh Conspiracy blog as well as the blogs of law professors Lawrence Lessig (Harvard) and Jack Balkin (Yale). He is considered so prolific a writer that in 2007, an article in the legal publication The Green Bag coined the concept of a "Sunstein number" reflecting degrees of separation between various legal authors and Sunstein, paralleling the Erdős numbers sometimes assigned to mathematician authors.

He is a member of the American Academy of Arts and Sciences (elected 1992), the American Law Institute (since 1990), and the American Philosophical Society (elected 2010). He received an Honorary Doctorate from Copenhagen Business School.

In February 2020, he wrote an article for Bloomberg titled "The Cognitive Bias That Makes Us Panic About Coronavirus". In it he claimed that "A lot more people are more scared than they have any reason to be" and that "Most people in North America and Europe do not need to worry much about the risk of contracting the disease. That's true even for people who are traveling to nations such as Italy that have seen outbreaks of the disease." He attributed the excessive perceived risk to probability neglect. At time of publication, there have been 68 confirmed COVID-19 cases in the U.S., including one death, and approximately 1000 new daily cases worldwide, over 300 of which in Europe.

Sunstein joined the Department of Homeland Security in February 2021 as an advisor to the Biden Administration on immigration policy.

Together with Daniel Kahneman and Olivier Sibony, Sunstein co-authored Noise: A Flaw in Human Judgment, which was published in May 2021. Drawing not least upon legal examples, it treats of unwanted variability in human judgments of the same problem, for instance when court judges recommend vastly different sentences for the same crimes. The book looks both at what 'noise in human judgment' is, how it can be detected and how it can be reduced.

Views

Legal philosophy
Sunstein is a proponent of judicial minimalism, arguing that judges should focus primarily on deciding the case at hand, and avoid making sweeping changes to the law or decisions that have broad-reaching effects. Some view him as liberal, despite Sunstein's public support for George W. Bush's judicial nominees Michael W. McConnell and John G. Roberts, as well as providing strongly maintained theoretical support for the death penalty. Conservative libertarian legal scholar Richard A. Epstein described Sunstein as "one of the more conservative players in the Obama administration."

Much of his work also brings behavioral economics to bear on law, suggesting that the "rational actor" model will sometimes produce an inadequate understanding of how people will respond to legal intervention.

Sunstein has collaborated with academics who have training in behavioral economics, most notably Daniel Kahneman, Richard Thaler, and Christine M. Jolls, to show how the theoretical assumptions of law and economics should be modified by new empirical findings about how people actually behave. 

According to Sunstein, the interpretation of federal law should be made not by judges but by the beliefs and commitments of the U.S. president and those around him.
"There is no reason to believe that in the face of statutory ambiguity, the meaning of federal law should be settled by the inclinations and predispositions of federal judges. The outcome should instead depend on the commitments and beliefs of the President and those who operate under him," argued Sunstein.

Sunstein (along with his coauthor Richard Thaler) has elaborated the theory of libertarian paternalism.  In arguing for this theory, he counsels thinkers/academics/politicians to embrace the findings of behavioral economics as applied to law, maintaining freedom of choice while also steering peoples' decisions in directions that will make their lives go better. With Thaler, he coined the term "choice architect".

Military commissions
In 2002, at the height of controversy over Bush's creation of military commissions without Congressional approval, Sunstein stepped forward to insist, "Under existing law, President George W. Bush has the legal authority to use military commissions" and that "President Bush's choice stands on firm legal ground." Sunstein scorned as "ludicrous" an argument from law professor George P. Fletcher, who believed that the Supreme Court would find Bush's military commissions without any legal basis. In 2006, the Supreme Court found the tribunals illegal in Hamdan v. Rumsfeld in a 5–3 vote.

First Amendment
In his book Democracy and the Problem of Free Speech Sunstein says there is a need to reformulate First Amendment law. He thinks that the current formulation, based on Justice Holmes' conception of free speech as a marketplace, "disserves the aspirations of those who wrote America's founding document." The purpose of this reformulation would be to "reinvigorate processes of democratic deliberation, by ensuring greater attention to public issues and greater diversity of views." He is concerned by the present "situation in which like-minded people speak or listen mostly to one another," and thinks that in "light of astonishing economic and technological changes, we must doubt whether, as interpreted, the constitutional guarantee of free speech is adequately serving democratic goals." He proposes a "New Deal for speech [that] would draw on Justice Brandeis' insistence on the role of free speech in promoting political deliberation and citizenship."

Animal rights 
Some of Sunstein's work has addressed the question of animal rights, as he co-authored a book dealing with the subject, has written papers on it, and was an invited speaker at "Facing Animals", an event at Harvard University described as "a groundbreaking panel on animals in ethics and the law." "Every reasonable person believes in animal rights," he says, continuing that "we might conclude that certain practices cannot be defended and should not be allowed to continue, if, in practice, mere regulation will inevitably be insufficient – and if, in practice, mere regulation will ensure that the level of animal suffering will remain very high."

Sunstein's views on animal rights generated controversy when Sen. Saxby Chambliss (R-Ga.) blocked his appointment to the Office of Information and Regulatory Affairs by Obama. Chambliss objected to the introduction of Animal Rights: Current Debates and New Directions, a volume edited by Sunstein and his then-companion Martha Nussbaum. On page 11 of the introduction, during a philosophical discussion about whether animals should be thought of as owned by humans, Sunstein notes that personhood need not be conferred upon an animal in order to grant it various legal protections against abuse or cruelty, even including legal standing for suit. For example, under current law, if someone saw their neighbor beating a dog, they cannot sue for animal cruelty because they do not have legal standing to do so. Sunstein suggests that granting standing to animals, actionable by other parties, could decrease animal cruelty by increasing the likelihood that animal abuse will be punished.

Taxation 
Sunstein has argued, "We should celebrate tax day." Sunstein argues that since government (in the form of police, fire departments, insured banks, and courts) protects and preserves property and liberty, individuals should happily finance it with their tax dollars:

In what sense is the money in our pockets and bank accounts fully 'ours'? Did we earn it by our own autonomous efforts? Could we have inherited it without the assistance of probate courts? Do we save it without the support of bank regulators? Could we spend it if there were no public officials to coordinate the efforts and pool the resources of the community in which we live? Without taxes, there would be no liberty. Without taxes there would be no property. Without taxes, few of us would have any assets worth defending. [It is] a dim fiction that some people enjoy and exercise their rights without placing any burden whatsoever on the public... There is no liberty without dependency.

Sunstein goes on to say:
If government could not intervene effectively, none of the individual rights to which Americans have become accustomed could be reliably protected.... This is why the overused distinction between "negative" and "positive" rights makes little sense. Rights to private property, freedom of speech, immunity from police abuse, contractual liberty, free exercise of religion – just as much as rights to Social Security, Medicare and food stamps – are taxpayer-funded and government-managed social services designed to improve collective and individual well-being.

Marriage 
In Nudge: Improving Decisions About Health, Wealth, and Happiness, Sunstein proposes that government recognition of marriage be discontinued. "Under our proposal, the word marriage would no longer appear in any laws, and marriage licenses would no longer be offered or recognized by any level of government," argues Sunstein. He continues, "the only legal status states would confer on couples would be a civil union, which would be a domestic partnership agreement between any two people." He goes on further, "Governments would not be asked to endorse any particular relationships by conferring on them the term marriage," and refers to state-recognized marriage as an "official license scheme".
Sunstein addressed the Senate on July 11, 1996, advising against the Defense of Marriage Act.

"Conspiracy Theories" and government infiltration 
Sunstein co-authored a 2008 paper with Adrian Vermeule, titled "Conspiracy Theories", dealing with the risks and possible government responses to conspiracy theories resulting from "cascades" of faulty information within groups that may ultimately lead to violence. In this article they wrote, "The existence of both domestic and foreign conspiracy theories, we suggest, is no trivial matter, posing real risks to the government's antiterrorism policies, whatever the latter may be."  They go on to propose that, "the best response consists in cognitive infiltration of extremist groups", where they suggest, among other tactics, "Government agents (and their allies) might enter chat rooms, online social networks, or even real-space groups and attempt to undermine percolating conspiracy theories by raising doubts about their factual premises, causal logic or implications for political action." They refer, several times, to groups that promote the view that the US Government was responsible or complicit in the September 11 attacks as "extremist groups".
The authors declare that there are five hypothetical responses a government can take toward conspiracy theories: "We can readily imagine a series of possible responses. (1) Government might ban conspiracy theorizing. (2) Government might impose some kind of tax, financial or otherwise, on those who disseminate such theories. (3) Government might itself engage in counterspeech, marshaling arguments to discredit conspiracy theories. (4) Government might formally hire credible private parties to engage in counterspeech. (5) Government might engage in informal communication with such parties, encouraging them to help." However, the authors advocate that each "instrument has a distinctive set of potential effects, or costs and benefits, and each will have a place under imaginable conditions. However, our main policy idea is that government should engage in cognitive infiltration of the groups that produce conspiracy theories, which involves a mix of (3), (4) and (5)."

Sunstein and Vermeule also analyze the practice of recruiting "nongovernmental officials"; they suggest that "government can supply these independent experts with information and perhaps prod them into action from behind the scenes," further warning that "too close a connection will be self-defeating if it is exposed." Sunstein and Vermeule argue that the practice of enlisting non-government officials, "might ensure that credible independent experts offer the rebuttal, rather than government officials themselves. There is a tradeoff between credibility and control, however. The price of credibility is that government cannot be seen to control the independent experts." This position has been criticized by some commentators who argue that it would violate prohibitions on government propaganda aimed at domestic citizens. Sunstein and Vermeule's proposed infiltrations have also been met by sharply critical scholarly responses.

Star Wars 
In 2016, Sunstein wrote of the Disney film franchise Star Wars that "Star Wars is about freedom of choice and our never-ending ability to make the right decision when the chips are down," comparing the importance of the films to the Bible, Santa Claus, and Mickey Mouse. The publication was reviewed in Time magazine, where it was described as "the ultimate primer for guiding a Star Wars padawan to the level of Jedi Knight."

"Star Wars", he writes, "is a grain of sand; it contains a whole world." This, he argues, is evident even if one "can't tell an Ackbar from [...] a Snoke." As he develops his thesis, he takes this argument further, arguing that the "hidden message and the real magic of Star Wars" is "its rousing tribute to human freedom". In an interview with The A.V. Club, Sunstein stated that he felt "over the moon about Star Wars". The film franchise, in his view, "casts light not just on the saga of our time, but also on everything about our culture," and includes many "puzzles" for the curious. Despite his overall positive view of George Lucas' oeuvre and the impact of the franchise on society, Sunstein had some criticism for the prequel films, and likened that to society at large:

The sky is always falling or the sky is always bright. In some ways, this is really morning in America and we don’t see it. People are living longer, the economy is doing pretty well. On the other hand, there are some ways of thinking in the current situation that make it look not so good, including our Star Wars prequels

Sunstein compared Star Wars to his work for the Obama administration, saying that his approach to regulatory reform was very similar to Lucas' constrained approach to the movies as "episodes".

Personal life
In the 1980s and early 1990s, Sunstein was married to Lisa Ruddick, whom he met when both were undergraduates at Harvard. She is Associate Professor Emerita of English at the University of Chicago, specializing in British modernism. Their marriage ended in divorce. Their daughter Ellyn is a journalist and photographer. Thereafter, Sunstein dated Martha Nussbaum for almost a decade.  Nussbaum is a philosopher, classicist, and professor of law at the University of Chicago.

On July 4, 2008, Sunstein married Samantha Power, a diplomat and government official who would serve as United States Ambassador to the United Nations, whom he met when they both worked as campaign advisors to Barack Obama. The wedding took place in the Church of Mary Immaculate, in Lohar, Waterville, Ireland. They have two children: a son, Declan Power Sunstein (April 24, 2009). and a daughter, Rían Power Sunstein (June 1, 2012).

Sunstein is an avid amateur squash player who has played against professionals in PSA tournaments and in 2017 was ranked 449th in the world by the Professional Squash Association.

Honors
In July 2017, Sunstein was elected a Corresponding Fellow of the British Academy (FBA), the United Kingdom's national academy for the humanities and social sciences.

In 2018 he was awarded the Holberg Prize for having "reshaped our understanding of the relationship between the modern regulatory state and constitutional law. He is widely regarded as the leading scholar of administrative law in the U.S., and he is by far the most cited legal scholar in the United States and probably the world."

Publications

Books
1990–1999
 
 
 
 
 
 
 
 
 

2000–2009
 
 
 
 
 
 
 
 
Translation: 
 
 
  (based on the Seeley Lectures 2004 at Cambridge University)
Translation: 
 
 
 
 
 
 
 
Translation: 
 
 

2010 onwards

Journal articles

See also
 Barack Obama Supreme Court candidates
 Choice architecture
 List of animal rights advocates
 List of law clerks of the Supreme Court of the United States (Seat 10)
 List of U.S. executive branch 'czars'

References

External links
It's All Cass Sunstein's Default a 2017 strategy+business magazine "creative mind" profile.
 
 Sunstein's Faculty Page
 CPAT Articles
 
 
 Sunstein's articles for The New Republic
 Cass Sunstein discusses Why Societies Need Dissent, at the Carnegie Council
 Sunstein on Wikipedia
 Sunstein blogging at Balkinization
 Sunstein blogging at Oxford University Press
 
 Video Interview/Discussion from June 2008 with Eugene Volokh on Bloggingheads.tv
 Video debate with Sunstein and Henry Farrell on Bloggingheads.tv
 "Catching up with Cass" interview in the Harvard Law Record
 Report on Sunstein's Harvard Law chair lecture reported in the Harvard Law Record
 Green nudges: An interview with Obama regulatory czar Cass Sunstein interview on Grist.org
 Sunstein author page and article archive from The New York Review of Books
 Podcast of lecture, 2007 "If the Public Would Be Outraged by Their Rulings, Should Judges Care?" lecture

1954 births
Administrators of the Office of Information and Regulatory Affairs
American animal rights scholars
American bloggers
American legal scholars
American legal writers
American political writers
American male non-fiction writers
Critics of conspiracy theories
Intellectual property law scholars
Jewish American writers
The Harvard Lampoon alumni
Harvard Law School alumni
Harvard Law School faculty
Law clerks of the Supreme Court of the United States
Living people
People from Concord, Massachusetts
Scholars of constitutional law
University of Chicago faculty
Corresponding Fellows of the British Academy
Middlesex School alumni
21st-century American non-fiction writers
Harvard College alumni
American male bloggers
Nudge theory
Carnegie Council for Ethics in International Affairs
21st-century American Jews
Holberg Prize laureates